Xenophidion schaeferi, also known commonly as the Malayan spinejaw snake or Schäfer's spiny-jawed snake, is a species of snake in the monotypic family Xenophidiidae. The species is endemic to Malaysia.

Etymology
The specific name, schaeferi is in honor of German herpetologist Christian Schäfer who collected the holotype.

Geographic range
X. schaeferi is found in the Malaysian state of Selangor, in western Peninsular Malaysia.

Habitat
The preferred natural habitat of X. schaeferi is forest.

Reproduction
X. schaeferi is oviparous.

DNA sequence divergence of sibling species
In the genus Xenophidion, there is one sister species, X. acanthognathus. Molecular analyses of a new specimen of X. acanthognathus reveal that it only differs from the holotype of X. schaeferi by a minimum sequence divergence of 0.27%.

References

Further reading
Manthey U, Günther R (1995). "Xenophidion, a new genus with two new species of snakes from Malaysia (Serpentes, Colubridae)". Amphibia-Reptilia 16 (3): 229–240. (Xenophidion schaeferi, new species).

Alethinophidia
Snakes of Southeast Asia
Reptiles of Malaysia
Endemic fauna of Malaysia
Reptiles described in 1995